A  doctor of both laws, from the Latin doctor utriusque juris, or juris utriusque doctor, or doctor juris utriusque ("doctor of both laws") (abbreviations include: JUD, IUD, DUJ, JUDr., DUI, DJU, Dr.iur.utr., Dr.jur.utr., DIU, UJD and UID) is a scholar who has acquired a doctorate in both civil and church law. The degree was common among Roman Catholic and German scholars of the Middle Ages and early modern times. Today the degree is awarded by the Pontifical Lateran University after a period of six years of study, by the University of Würzburg, and by the University of Fribourg, as well as the University of Cologne.

Between approximately the twelfth through the eighteenth centuries European students of law mastered the Ius commune, a pan-European legal system that held sway during that span.  It was composed of canon (church) law and Roman and feudal (civil) law, resulting in the degree of "Doctor of both laws". or of "Licentiatus of both laws".

Doctors of Civil and Canon Law
Agliardi, Antonio, Cardinal, Camerlengo of the Sacred College of Cardinals
Arregui Yarza, Antonio, Metropolitan Archbishop of the Roman Catholic Archdiocese of Guayaquil, Ecuador
Thomas Bach
Pope Benedict XIV
Bevilacqua, Anthony, Cardinal, Archbishop Emeritus of Philadelphia (USA)
 Jean de Dieu-Raymond de Cucé de Boisgelin
St. Charles Borromeo
 Edoardo Borromeo
 Giacomo Luigi Brignole
 Giovanni Battista Bussi (1755–1844)
 Antonio Maria Cagiano de Azevedo
 Étienne Hubert de Cambacérès
 Giovanni Battista Caprara
 Filippo Giudice Caracciolo
 Domenico Carafa della Spina di Traetto
 Francesco Carafa di Trajetto
Carafa, Pierluigi (iuniore), Cardinal, Camerlengo of the Sacred College of Cardinals, Dean of the College of Cardinals
Luigi Dadaglio, Cardinal, Major Penitentiary of the Apostolic Penitentiary
 Antonio Despuig y Dameto
 Michele di Pietro
Domenico Ferrata, Cardinal, Secretary of State
 Giuseppe Milesi Pironi Ferretti
Michael J. Fitzgerald, Auxiliary Bishop of the Archdiocese of Philadelphia
Enrico Gasparri, Cardinal, Prefect of the Supreme Tribunal of the Apostolic Signatura
Pietro Gasparri, Cardinal, Secretary of State, codifier of 1917 Code of Canon Law
 Pietro Giannelli
 Giacomo Giustiniani
Józef Glemp, Cardinal, late Archbishop emeritus of Warsaw (Poland)
Archbishop Filippo Iannone, appointed Vicegerent of the Diocese of Rome 31 January 2012
Stephan Kuttner, Professor, Catholic University of America, Yale University, and University of California at Berkeley, founder of the Stephan Kuttner Institute of Medieval Canon Law
 Carlo Laurenzi
Pope Leo XIII
Alphonsus Maria de Liguori, Bishop of Sant'Agata de' Goti
Listecki, Jerome Edward, Archbishop of Milwaukee (USA)
 Vincenzo Macchi
 Lorenzo Girolamo Mattei
 Teodolfo Mertel, last lay cardinal in the Catholic Church
 Denzil Meuli, priest of the diocese of Auckland
 Alfonso Ortiz, editor of the Mozarabic Missal (1500) and Breviary (1502)
J. K. Paasikivi, President of Finland
Giovanni Panico, cardinal and nuncio
Salvatore Pappalardo, Cardinal, Archbishop of Palermo (Italy)
Thomas J. Paprocki, Bishop of Roman Catholic Diocese of Springfield in Illinois (USA)
Peters, Edward N., Catholic University of America, 1991
Luigi Poggi, Cardinal, Archivist and Librarian Emeritus of the Holy Roman Church
Mario Francesco Pompedda, Cardinal, Prefect of the Supreme Tribunal of the Apostolic Signatura
Pietro Respighi, Cardinal, Archpriest of the Basilica of St. John Lateran
 Gabriele della Genga Sermattei
 K. J. Ståhlberg, President of Finland
 Alessandro Verde, Cardinal, Archpriest of the Basilica di Santa Maria Maggiore (Italy)
 Pietro Vidoni
 Carlo Maria Viganò, Archbishop at the centre of the Vatileaks scandal
 Jan Wężyk
 Jean-Baptiste van Dievoet (1775-1862) JUL (Juris Utriusque Licentiatus) of the Old University of Leuven.
Antonín Theodor Colloredo-Waldsee, Cardinal, Archbishop of Olomouc

See also
Doctor of Canon Law
Legum Doctor

References

Laws, Doctor
Law degrees
Religious degrees
Dual academic degrees
Academic canon law